The 2021 Cleveland mayoral election took place on November 2, 2021, to elect the Mayor of Cleveland, Ohio. The election was officially nonpartisan, with the top two candidates from the September 14 primary election advancing to the general election, regardless of party. Incumbent Democratic Mayor Frank G. Jackson was eligible to run for reelection to a fifth term, but instead chose to retire. Justin Bibb was elected the 58th mayor of Cleveland in the general election.

Candidates

Winner

Advanced to general

Eliminated in primary

Withdrew
 Landry McNord Simmons Jr., Cuyahoga County Deputy Sheriff and Cuyahoga County Republican Party committee member

Disqualified
 James Jerome Bell, realtor and perennial candidate
 Michael J. Chal
 Michael F. Kilbane
 Arthur O. Kostendt
 Keyshawn Dwayne Varnado
 Anthony Lee Wilson
 Latorya Jean Witcher

Declined
 Dan Brady, former president of Cuyahoga County Council, former state senator, and former city council member
 Blaine Griffin, city council member (running for re-election)
Frank G. Jackson, incumbent mayor (endorsed Kelley)
 Dick Knoth, partner at BakerHostetler
 Martin J. Sweeney, Cuyahoga County council member, former president of Cleveland City Council, and former state representative
 Matt Zone, former city council member

Primary election

Campaign

Ross DiBello became the first candidate to declare his intention to run on October 29, 2020. The next announcement came on January 12, 2021, when Justin Bibb became the second candidate to enter the race. In March, Zack Reed announced his second campaign for mayor after his unsuccessful run in 2017, followed by Kevin Kelley and Landry M. Simmons in April, and Sandra Williams in May.

On May 6, 2021 after much speculation, incumbent mayor Frank G. Jackson announced that he would not seek a fifth term. Jackson's announcement brought new interest to the race, as it suddenly became the first mayoral election in Cleveland since 2001 without an incumbent. Later the same day, Basheer Jones entered the race.

Dennis Kucinich, a longtime presence in Cleveland politics who had been rumored to be considering a run, announced his candidacy on June 14, 2021, two days before the deadline for submitting signatures to the Cuyahoga County Board of Elections.

Landry M. Simmons withdrew his candidacy after failing to reach the requisite 3,000 signatures needed to get on the ballot. Although municipal elections in Cleveland are officially nonpartisan, all seven qualified candidates were members of the Democratic Party.

A number of issues were debated by the candidates throughout the campaign. Every candidate except DiBello labeled crime as the preeminent issue of the race, which had reached record levels during the COVID-19 pandemic, including a 24% increase in assaults with firearms compared to 2020. Another major issue was poverty, due to Cleveland's status as the poorest major city in the United States. The issues of economic development, education, and government accountability and accessibility were also given attention, the latter in particular received emphasis due to the conviction of longtime Cleveland City Councilman Ken Johnson in late July 2021 on federal corruption charges as well as the Ohio nuclear bribery scandal.

In the primary, Justin Bibb placed first and Kevin Kelley placed second, sending both candidates to the November 2, 2021 general election. The result came as somewhat of an upset, mainly due to the unexpected weakness of Dennis Kucinich who came in third despite polling placing him in first.

The primary's 16.2% voter turnout was the highest for a mayoral primary in Cleveland since 2005.

Endorsements

Debates

Polling

Results

General election

Campaign
Due to both primary winners finding their strongest support in the West Side of Cleveland, both campaigns paid significant attention to the predominantly African-American East Side, where although Bibb was the best performing candidate, a majority of voters cast ballots for candidates other than Bibb or Kelley in the primary. On September 29, the two former East Side mayoral candidates Zack Reed and Basheer Jones made endorsements for Bibb and Kelley, respectively.

Bibb campaigned as a progressive who would change how the city works as mayor, while Kelley presented himself as a moderate and experienced politician who would be prepared to lead from the start of his tenure.

Bibb and Kelley delineated themselves heavily over Issue 24, a proposed amendment to the city charter of Cleveland that went to voters on the same ballot as the mayoral election, which would implement greater civilian oversight of the Cleveland Police Department. Bibb favored the initiative as a way to create accountability while Kelley rejected it as a danger which could potentially lead to an exodus of officers from the Department. On election day, the Issue would pass with 32,184 votes in favor and 21,972 votes against.

Endorsements
Endorsements in bold were made after the primary election.

Debates

Polling

Results

Results by Ward
Bibb won 12 of Cleveland's 17 wards. Bibb found overwhelming support on the East Side of the city, while Kelley narrowly won the most votes on the West Side.

Notes

Non-independent clients

References

External links
After Jackson, NPR-WCPN podcast on the mayoral election

Official campaign websites
 Justin Bibb for Mayor
 Ross DiBello for Mayor
 Basheer Jones for Mayor
 Kevin Kelley for Mayor
 Dennis Kucinich for Mayor
 Zack Reed for Mayor
 Sandra Williams for Mayor

2020s in Cleveland
Cleveland mayoral
Cleveland
Mayoral elections in Cleveland
Non-partisan elections